

Biography 
William Haile (1797March 7, 1837) was an American politician who served as a U.S. Representative from Mississippi from 1826 to 1828.

Born in 1797, Haile moved to Mississippi and settled in Woodville, Wilkinson County.
He served as member of the State house of representatives in 1826.

Congress 
Haile was elected as a Jacksonian to the Nineteenth Congress to fill the vacancy caused by the death of Christopher Rankin.
He was reelected as a Jacksonian to the Twentieth Congress and served from July 10, 1826, to September 12, 1828, when he resigned.

Later career and death 
He was an unsuccessful candidate for reelection in 1828 to the Twenty-first Congress.
He served as delegate to the State constitutional convention in 1832.
He died near Woodville, Mississippi, March 7, 1837.

References

1797 births
1837 deaths
Members of the Mississippi House of Representatives
Jacksonian members of the United States House of Representatives from Mississippi
19th-century American politicians